New Haven station could refer to:
 Newhaven Marine railway station
 Union Station (New Haven), the principal train station in New Haven, Connecticut
 New Haven State Street station, a smaller train station in New Haven, Connecticut
 New Haven station (Indiana), a disused train station in New Haven, Indiana